Federal or foederal (archaic) may refer to:

Politics

General
Federal monarchy, a federation of monarchies
Federation, or Federal state (federal system), a type of government characterized by both a central (federal) government and states or regional governments that are partially self-governing; a union of states
Federal republic, a federation which is a republic
Federalism, a political philosophy
Federalist, a political belief or member of a political grouping
Federalization, implementation of federalism

Particular governments
Federal government of the United States
United States federal law
United States federal courts
Government of Argentina
Government of Australia
Government of Pakistan
Federal government of Brazil
Government of Canada
Government of India
Federal government of Mexico
Federal government of Nigeria
Government of Russia
Government of South Africa
Government of Philippines

Other
The Federalist Papers, critical early arguments in favor of approving the United States Constitution
Federal Party (disambiguation), various political parties

Places
Federal, Entre Ríos, a city in Argentina
Federal, New South Wales, a town in Australia
Federal, Pleasants County, West Virginia, an unincorporated community in the United States
Federal, Queensland, a town in Australia
Federal Corners, New York, a hamlet in New York
Colonia Federal, a neighborhood in Mexico City

Transportation
Federal (Amtrak), a passenger train providing an overnight Boston-Washington, D.C. service in 2003 and 2004
Federal Express (train), a passenger train operated by the New Haven and Pennsylvania railroads
Federal Corporation, a Taiwanese tyre manufacturer
FedEx, a logistical services/delivery company based in the United States of America
Federal Motor Truck Company, an American truck manufacturer headquartered in Detroit, Michigan (1910–1959)

Entertainment
Federal (album), the debut album by rapper E-40
Federal (film), a 2010 thriller film starring Selton Mello
Federal Records, a subsidiary label of King Records.

Other uses
 Federal architecture, an architectural style related to Biedermayer, Recency and Empire-style architecture
 Federal furniture, American furniture produced in the same era
 Special agent, person that work for a federal agency in United States
 Federal Premium Ammunition, an American ammunition manufacturer
Federal Reserve, the central bank of the United States
C.D. Federal, a Honduran football club
OFK Federal, a defunct Montenegrin football club
Federal's, a defunct U.S. department store

See also
Fed (disambiguation)
Federale (disambiguation)
Federalism (disambiguation)
Federalist (disambiguation)
Federation (disambiguation)
 Federal Union (disambiguation)